Lovebox is the fourth studio album by English electronic dance music duo Groove Armada, released on 18 November 2002 by Jive Electro.

Track listing
 "Purple Haze" (Andy Cato, Tom Findlay, Bob Young, Brian Scott, Francis Rossi, Melvin Adams, Ronald Wilson, Wallace Wilson, William Hughes) – 4:04
 "Groove Is On" (Andy Cato, Tom Findlay, Delano Ogbourne) – 4:18
 "Remember" (Andy Cato, Tom Findlay, Sandy Denny) – 5:31
 "Madder"  (Andy Cato, Tom Findlay, Jonathan White, Keeling Lee, Clive Jenner, Michael Daniel) – 5:22
 "Think Twice" (Andy Cato, Tom Findlay, Cameron McVey, Neneh Cherry) – 5:59
 "Final Shakedown" (Andy Cato, Tom Findlay, Wallace Wilson) – 6:10
 "Be Careful What You Say" (UK Bonus Track) (Andy Cato, Tom Findlay) – 5:06
 "Hands of Time" (Andy Cato, Tom Findlay, Richie Havens) – 4:22
 "Tuning In" (Andy Cato, Tom Findlay, Jonathan White, Keeling Lee, Clive Jenner, Tim Hutton) – 5:12
 "Easy" (Andy Cato, Tom Findlay, Jean-Marc Cérrone, Don Ray, Sunshine Anderson) – 5:52
 "Lovebox" (Andy Cato, Tom Findlay) – 5:41
 "But I Feel Good" (Andy Cato, Tom Findlay, Anthony Daniel) – 5:18
 "Think Twice" (Tiefschwarz Remix) (Asian bonus track) (Andy Cato, Tom Findlay)

Bonus disc
 "Chicago" (live at Brixton 2002)
 "I See You Baby" (Fatboy Slim Remix)
 "Suntoucher" (Nextmen Submarine Remix)
 "Easy" (GA's Shake Shake Remix)
 "Fairport 2"
 "But I Feel Good" (Audio Bullys Dr. Feelgood Mix)

Personnel

Groove Armada
 Andy Cato - keyboards, drum programming, trombone, guitars, production
 Tom Findlay - keyboards, production

Additional musicians
 Keeling Lee - guitar (Purple Haze, Madder, Groove Is On, Tuning In)
 Jonathan White - bass (Purple Haze, Madder, Tuning In)
 Clive Jenner - drums (Purple Haze, Madder, Tuning In)
 Patrick Dawes - percussion (Purple Haze, Madder, Tuning In)
 Tim Hutton - vocals (Tuning In)
 Valerie Malcolm - vocals (Easy)
 Neneh Cherry - vocals (Think Twice, Groove Is On)
 Wallace 'Red Rat' Wilson - vocals (Purple Haze, The Final Shakedown)
 Richie Havens - vocals (Hands of Time)
 Nappy Roots - raps (Purple Haze)
 Michael "M.A.D" Daniel - raps (Madder, But I Feel Good)
 Delano Ogbourne - raps (Groove Is On)

Additional information
 In Ireland, the song "Madder" was used in idents that appeared on Network 2 during the channel's "iD" strand (programmes for teenagers), from January 2003 to April 2004. It also appeared in the opening of the 2003 video game Rayman 3: Hoodlum Havoc.
 "Purple Haze" was used in the movie The Girl Next Door (2004).
 The songs "Madder" and "Easy" were used in the Australian movie Gettin' Square.

Charts

Certifications

References

External links 

 

2002 albums
Groove Armada albums